Unorthodox is an American doom metal band from Maryland.

History
Unorthodox were originally called Asylum. They changed their name to Unorthodox after a band with a similar name achieved national success. They were one of many Maryland bands to be picked up in the early 1990s by Germany's Hellhound Records. They released two albums under Hellhound, 1993's Asylum and 1995's Balance of Power.

In 1994, Doom Records released a compilation entitled A Double Dose of Doom, featuring Obstination (who would later become Asylum) and Rat Salad (who would go on to become Iron Man). They also had a song, "Lifeline" on the Doom Capital compilation (2004 Crucial Blast Records). In 2007, Bipolar Demand Records re-released Asylum and included three bonus tracks. In 2008, the lineup of Dale Flood, Mark Ammen, and Gary Isom recorded a third album, Awaken, which was released on The Church Within Records in October 2008.

In 2009, Dale Flood moved to Nashville, Tennessee to raise his daughter.  Unorthodox still played sporadic festival appearances over the next several years with the original "Asylum" lineup until 2016. In 2017, he formed a new version of Unorthodox based in Nashville featuring Flummox bassist and drummer, Blake Dellinger and Alan Pfeifer.

Discography

Albums
Asylum (Hellhound Records 1993)
Balance of Power (Hellhound Records 1995)
Awaken (The Church Within Records 2008)

Reissue
Asylum +3 (Bipolar Demand Records 2007)

References

External links
Unorthodox Interview @ Cosmic Lava by Klaus Kleinowski

American doom metal musical groups
Heavy metal musical groups from Maryland
American stoner rock musical groups
Musical groups established in 1987
American musical trios
Hellhound Records artists